Nen (or Nen Zi, Nenium, Wekamara) is a Yam language spoken in the Bimadbn village in the Western Province of Papua New Guinea, with 250 speakers as of a 2002 SIL survey. It is situated between the speech communities of Nambu and Idi.

Nen has unusual lexicalization patterns in its verbs. It has very few intransitive verbs, and where some verbs would be intransitive in most other languages, Nen has a class of morphologically "middle" verbs in their place. Many of the few intransitive verbs that Nen does have are positional verbs, which refer to spatial positions and postures.

Phonology
The Nen phonemic inventory includes 22 consonants:

/h/ occurs rarely in a few interactional and deictic words.

Vowels i, ɪ, e, æ, a, (ə), o, u

/ã, ẽ/ occur rarely in a few interactional and deictic words.

Morphology

Number 
The realization of different grammatical meanings of Number in the noun depends on the syntactic function and case marking. The noun in the dative overtly differentiates 4 grammatical meaning of number: singular, dual, paucal and plural; the noun in the oblique shows singular ~ dual ~ paucal/plural opposition, while the ergative − singular ~ dual/paucal ~ plural, and the noun in absolutive cannot be distinguished according to number.

Direction 
The verb expresses three grammatical meaning of motion: neutral − /Ø-/, towards speaker /n-/, and away from speaker /ng-/: n-Ø-armbte '(s)he is ascending' ~ n-n-armbte '(s)he is coming up (towards speaker) ~ n-ng-armbte '(s)he is going up (away from speaker).

Syntax 
The constituent order in clause is SOV. Case marking shows ergative/absolutive alignment.

Argument structure and valency 
According to indexing, the verbs can be either prefixing (an undergoer argument is cross-referenced by a prefix) or ambifixing (arguments are cross-referenced by both prefix and suffix in the verb). In the transitive predicate, a verbal prefix expresses patient and a verbal suffix − actor. There are several types of valency pattern in Nen:

1. Basically monovalent pattern
 Basic intransitive − NPabs U-V
 Intrinsic middle − NPabs M-V-A
 Middle with cognate object − NPabs + NPabs M-V-A
2. Basically divalent pattern
 Basic transitive − NPerg + NPabs U-V-A
 Experiencer object construction − NPabs > NPerg U-V-A3sg
 Transitive verbs with deponent middle verbal morphology − Nperg + NPabs M-V-A
 Semi-transitive verb registering oblique on undergoer slot − NPerg + NPobl U-V-A
3. Trivalent pattern

The arguments get the following case marking: the subject − ergative, the direct object − absolutive, and the indirect object − dative. In a trivalent predicate, the indirect object argument (semantically, recipient) is cross-referenced in the verb by the undergoer prefix.

Causative 
The causative is got by the adding of the meaning 'cause (motion/trajectory) through sustained contact (carrying, leading etc.)' to the middle verbs. Prefix /wa-/ in the verb expresses the meaning and the causer and causee are reflected by the ergative and absolutive cases, respectively.

Benefactive 
Beneficiary is expressed by the undergoer prefix.

Notes

Further reading

References

External links
Nen dictionary by Nicholas Evans (on Dictionaria)

Nambu languages
Languages of Western Province (Papua New Guinea)